Piroska Abos Gvorgyzakab (born 13 July 1962) is a Spanish cross-country skier. She competed in the 1988 Winter Olympics.

References

1962 births
Living people
Cross-country skiers at the 1988 Winter Olympics
Spanish female cross-country skiers
Olympic cross-country skiers of Spain
People from Harghita County